Igor Novaković (born 9 December 1981) is a Serbian political scientist and director of research at The International and Security Affairs Centre - ISAC Fund.

Biography 
Igor Novaković was born on 9 December 1981 in Novi Sad. He graduated in 2005 from the University of Novi Sad Faculty of Philosophy, and then enrolled in the Interdisciplinary Master's Program in European Studies in English (CAESAR) at the same university. He later studied international relations at the Robert Rufili Faculty of Political Science University of Bologna, and spent one semester at New Bulgarian University in Sofia. He completed his master's degree in 2010.

Since January 2010 he has been employed by The International and Security Affairs Centre - ISAC Fund in Belgrade as a research associate. He became Research Director in 2015. In 2012 he became an associate of the international non-governmental organization The Council for Inclusive Governance (CIG). He received his PhD from the University of Belgrade Faculty of Political Sciences in 2016.

He is the coordinator of the Working Groups for Chapter 30 and 31 of the National Convention on the European Union. He also occasionally writes for the European Western Balkans portal. He is fluent in English, and speaks Italian and Bulgarian.

Selected bibliography 
Novaković is the author, co-author and editor of several publications, scientific and professional papers, as well as proposals for practical policy in the fields of European Studies, international relations, political and military neutrality, international security, Serbo-Albanian Relations and more.

References

External links 
 LinkedIn profile
 Biography on ISAC fund website
 Google Scholar profile

Serbian political scientists
1981 births
University of Bologna alumni
University of Belgrade alumni
University of Novi Sad alumni
Writers from Novi Sad
Living people